Chile adopted the metric system in 1848. Previously, the Spanish system of measures was used.

History
Since colonization, Chile had always used a unit system based on the Spanish customary units. In 1843, a law was passed formalizing it, and defining its fundamental unit, the vara, as a fraction of a metre.

Later, during the presidency of Manuel Bulnes, a law was passed on 29 January 1848, adopting the Metric System. Finally, Chile signed the Metre Convention in 1908.

Current exceptions
 Timber and pipes are sold in metres, but their width, thickness, and diameter are measured in inches.
 Nail mass is measured in grams, but length is measured in inches.
 Yarn is normally sold in yards.
 Tins of paint are usually sold in multiples of US gallons.
 Display sizes for the screens of televisions and computer monitors have their diagonals measured in inches.
 Tire pressure is measured in pounds per square inch.
 The most common paper size is letter (carta). A4 paper is rarely used.
 The price of copper, Chile's most exported material, is usually quoted in dollars per pound.
 In the Chiloé islands, the almud (a Spanish unit) is used as a volume measurement for "drys" (between six or eight litres).
 McDonald's sells its Quarter Pounder with cheese as "Cuarto de Libra con Queso", which translates from Spanish as "Quarter Pound with Cheese".
 Like in most countries, aviation (altitude and flight level) is measured in feet.

References

Chile
1848 in South America